Craig Smart may refer to:

Craig Smart (journalist), Australian journalist
Craig Smart (singer), Canadian singer songwriter